WKKB (100.3 FM, "Latina 100.3") is a radio station in Middletown, Rhode Island, United States. The station airs a Tropical format, which consists of such musical styles as salsa and merengue and some reggaeton. Its transmitter is located in Middletown. Its offices and studios are located in 75 Oxford Street in Providence, while its transmitter is located in Tiverton. Prior to its switch to Tropical, the station was a rock station.

History

WKKB started out as WOTB in 1974 on 107.1 MHz. WOTB was a smooth jazz station with the moniker "Cool FM", co-owned with WKFD/1370 in Wickford, later with WADK/1540 in Newport. WOTB switched frequencies to 100.3 MHz and boosted its effective radiated power to 6 kW.

The smooth jazz format ended on June 14, 1996, when it was sold to Urso Broadcasting.  WOTB then changed to WDGF and began simulcasting WDGE for a brief time. In February 1997, WDGF became a '70s oldies/disco station as "100.3 The Beat".  After stunting with a three-day electronic countdown, WDGF then became classic hits as WHKK "100FM The Hawk" on October 10, 1997.  During this time, 99.7 entered into simulcasting WHKK. Both stations then became all-'80s hits as "Z100" with the 100.3 frequency adopting the WZRI callsign.

In October 2002, WHKK's studios were moved to Fairhaven, Massachusetts with Citadel sister stations WBSM and WFHN.  On Halloween of that year, the calls were then changed to the current WKKB, and the station began targeting the South Coast region of Massachusetts by flipping to a rock format as "100.3 KKB"; the first song on KKB was "You Shook Me All Night Long" by AC/DC. During its run as a rock station, WKKB served as the Providence and South Coast affiliate of the Patriots Rock Radio Network.

In January 2005, Citadel sold WKKB and WAKX to Davidson Media Group; WKKB took on its current format on February 1 of that year.

WKKB was one of four stations sold to Red Wolf Broadcasting in 2015.

Brian Ram serves as VP/Programming.

References

External links
 Latina 100.3 WKKB official website

KKB
KKB
Middletown, Rhode Island
Radio stations established in 1978
Tropical music radio stations